Stigmatomma electrina is an extinct species of ant in the genus Stigmatomma. It was described in 2009 after fossils were found in the Baltic Amber.

References

†
Fossil taxa described in 2009
Fossil ant taxa
Prehistoric insects of Europe
Eocene insects